was a Japanese actor and voice actor originally from Fukuoka Prefecture. On February 24, 1991, he died of intra-axial hematoma at the age of 58. After his death, his ongoing roles went to Takeshi Watabe.

Filmography
Space Battleship Yamato III (Gorō Raiden)
Esper Mami (Aoyama-sensei)
Kaibutsu-kun (Wolfman, Franken)
Gatchaman (Ryu the Horned Owl)
Kyojin no Hoshi (Hosaku Samon)
GeGeGe no Kitaro 1971 (Merman, Kasa-obake)
Fist of the North Star (Kemada)
Zenderman (Saigo-san)
Andersen Stories (Bad Priest)
Tiger Mask (Giant Baba)
Fang of the Sun Dougram (Dick Lertoff)
Astro Boy (Inspector Tawashi)
Dokaben (Takezo Inukai)
Obake no Q-tarō (Kaminari, Papa's boss)
Doraemon (Kaminari (First Voice))
Norakuro (Deka)
Maison Ikkoku (Yagami's Father)
Lupin III 1st Series (Gordan)
Police Academy: The Animated Series (Professor and Mauser)
Mobile Suit Gundam Movie II (Kozun Graham)
Robotto Keiji (Kaminariman, Taihoman)

External links
 

1932 births
1991 deaths
Japanese male video game actors
Japanese male voice actors
Male voice actors from Fukuoka Prefecture
20th-century Japanese male actors